Cantharis aneba is a species of soldier beetle in the family Cantharidae. It is found in North America.

Subspecies
These two subspecies belong to the species Cantharis aneba:
 Cantharis aneba aneba
 Cantharis aneba borealis McKey-Fender, 1951

References

Further reading

 
 

Cantharidae
Articles created by Qbugbot
Beetles described in 1951